Buddhi Bahadhur Pradhan (born 15 December 1978) is an international cricket umpire. In January 2018, he was named as one of the seventeen on-field umpires for the 2018 Under-19 Cricket World Cup. In January 2022, he was named as one of the on-field umpires for the 2022 ICC Under-19 Cricket World Cup in the West Indies.

See also
 List of One Day International cricket umpires
 List of Twenty20 International cricket umpires

References

External links
Buddhi Pradhan at ESPNcricinfo
Buddhi Pradhan at CricketArchive

1978 births
Living people
Nepalese cricket umpires
Nepalese One Day International cricket umpires
Nepalese Twenty20 International cricket umpires